Beladin may refer to:
Beladin
Beladin (state constituency), formerly represented in the Sarawak State Legislative Assembly (1991–96)